Oliver Francis O'Grady (born 5 June 1945) is an Irish laicized Catholic priest who molested and abused at least 25 children in California from 1973 onwards. His abuse and Cardinal Roger Mahony's attempts to hide the crimes are the subject of Amy J. Berg's documentary film Deliver Us from Evil in 2006.

Early life 
Born in Limerick, O'Grady was ordained into the priesthood at a seminary in Thurles in 1971 and emigrated to the United States later that year. He served as a priest at St Anne's Catholic Church in Lodi, California from 1971 to 1978. He later served at Church of the Presentation in Stockton, California, Sacred Heart Catholic Church in Turlock, California, St. Andrew's Parish in San Andreas, California, and St Anthony's Catholic Church in Hughson, California. He claimed to have been himself molested by a priest at the age of 10, and that he was involved in sexual abuse in his own family, both as perpetrator and victim.

Crimes 
In 1993 he was convicted on four counts of "lewd and lascivious acts" on two minors, the brothers Joseph and James Howard, and was sentenced to 14 years in prison. Attorney Jeff Anderson said O'Grady repeatedly molested the Howards between 1978 and 1991, from age three to 13. Anderson claimed church officials knew that O'Grady had abused children as early as 1976 and 1984 but had done nothing. Police had been informed of earlier charges and had declined to file charges. Bishop Roger Mahony sent O'Grady to a psychiatrist for an evaluation and the second opinion said the counseling was satisfactory; the second opinion did not recommend he be removed from ministry, nor established a diagnosis of pedophilia." In 1998 a civil jury ordered the Catholic Diocese of Stockton to pay US$30 million in damages to the brothers. A judge later reduced the amount to $7 million. O'Grady was paroled from prison in 2000 after serving seven years, and went to Ireland after being deported from the United States.

In a 2005 videotaped deposition, O'Grady claimed he abused at least as many as 25 children in and around Northern California. There have been lawsuits filed accusing O'Grady of abusing children while a seminarian in Ireland.

Film 

O'Grady is the subject of Amy J. Berg's documentary film Deliver Us from Evil in 2006. O'Grady said he wanted the film to serve as the "most honest confession of [his] life." He details how he preyed on children, and claims Church officials knew about his abuses but protected him by moving him from parish to parish. O'Grady confirmed that his bishop knew that there were claims that he had abused children in 1976 and before, and that the diocese responded by transferring him to another parish. The film ends by saying that O'Grady is free in Ireland, but that an American priest is making efforts to see that he and other abusers are monitored.

Present day 
Since his deportation to Ireland in 2001, he has been reported as living in Waterford city and the Dublin suburb of Phibsboro. In October, 2006, it was reported that he had left Ireland possibly for France and "may be en route to Canada". In 2007 the Irish Examiner reported O'Grady's solicitor claiming O'Grady registered voluntarily with the local Gardaí. In October, 2007, the rented house where he was living in Dundalk was burgled and damaged. In October 2008 it was reported that California-based lawyers were considering offering a reward for information about his whereabouts in Ireland so further civil actions could be pursued against him.

In March 2010 the Sunday Tribune reported that he was living in Rotterdam, Netherlands, where he volunteered at a Catholic parish, assuming a different identity, calling himself "Brother Francis"; Father Avin Kunnekkadan, the priest in charge of the parish denied knowing about his criminal past. O'Grady was subsequently dismissed from his positions. In December 2010 he was arrested in Dublin for possession of child pornography. The victims were as young as two years old. Authorities discovered child pornography photos and videos on O'Grady's laptop, on an external hard drive, and on a USB flash drive. Judge Patrick McMahon remanded O'Grady on continuing bail to appear again on 28 January. As part of his bail conditions O'Grady was required to sign on twice daily at Dublin's Harcourt Terrace Garda station, and surrendered his passport. In January 2012, O'Grady was sentenced to three years in prison in Ireland for possession of child pornography.

By 2016, the Irish Sun reported that O'Grady returned to Waterford, lived across the street from a playground and was attempting to remove his criminal history from the Internet. In 2018, Bishop Alphonsus Cullinan distributed a letter warning residents of the Waterford area alerting them of O'Grady's activities, noting that he is an ”extremely dangerous paedophile” and “actively seeking victims in our midst”. The Bishop also stated in the letter that the Gardaí had been informed of O'Grady's recent activities.

In October 2019, O’Grady was arrested in the Algarve area of Portugal. According to statement from Portuguese police, he is suspected of child pornography offences. He was extradited from Portugal to Ireland and appeared before an Irish court in November 2019. In October 2020, a jury in Waterford convicted O'Grady for possession of child pornography. O'Grady accepted the guilty verdict and was sentenced by the Waterford Circuit Court to 22 months in prison.

See also 
 Catholic sex abuse cases
 Roger Mahony - Sexual abuse cases

References 

1945 births
Living people
Clergy from Limerick (city)
Catholic Church sexual abuse scandals in the United States
Catholic priests convicted of child sexual abuse
Irish emigrants to the United States
Irish people convicted of child sexual abuse
20th-century Irish Roman Catholic priests
People deported from the United States
20th-century American Roman Catholic priests
American members of the clergy convicted of crimes
Laicized Roman Catholic priests
People convicted of child pornography offenses